Annadammula Anubandham is 1975 Indian Telugu-language action drama film, produced by the makeup artist M. Peethambaram and directed by S. D. Lal. The film stars N. T. Rama Rao, Murali Mohan, Nandamuri Balakrishna Latha, and music composed by Chakravarthy. It is a remake of the Hindi film Yaadon Ki Baaraat (1973). The film was a box office hit.

Plot 
Vijay, Anand, and Naveen are brothers. On the occasion of their father Venu Gopal's birthday, their mother Lakshmi teaches them a song titled "Aanaati Hrudayala", which they hold dear to their hearts. Once Venu Gopal witnesses a robbery made by a masked gangster Parasuram. To protect his identity, Parasuram slaughters Venu Gopal and Lakshmi. Vijay and Anand watch the deaths, with horror. Parusuram shoots at them, and they escape with the help of the kind-hearted henchmen of Parasuram John. But they get separated, while Naveen is whisked by their maternal aunt.

Years roll by, and Vijay is haunted by the memory of his parents' murder and joins an assistant Devadas on a crime spree around the city. Anand is reared by an elderly Ramaiah while Naveen becomes a famous pop singer who always offsets his brothers with their family song. The Police eventually apprehend John, sentenced to 15 years, Vijay is anxiously waiting for his return. Soon after, he gets acquainted with John's daughter Geeta without knowing her identity and both of them come closer. Anand's love of his life is Sunitha / Sony, daughter of a millionaire Chandra Shekar and Naveen falls for his co-singer. The brothers meet several times, yet do not recognize each other.

Once Vijay saves Anand and Sony from Parasuram's son Shekar. Discerning Vijay's caliber Parasuram appoints him as a white knight and he succeeds in their several tasks courageously. Meanwhile, John releases, and Vijay chases and recognizes him as their helper in childhood. Now John conveys the only way to find Parasuram is by his habit of wearing two different sizes of shoes 8 and 9 respectively. John toils and uncovers Parasuram but he is slain by him. Before dying, he writes a letter to Vijay regarding the whereabouts of Parasuram. 

Parasuram exploits Vijay to seize Sony for her father's treasure instead of the letter when Vijay seeks Sony's help and keeps her in their custody. At that point, Vijay notices Parasuram's shoes and identifies him as the murderer of his parents. At the same time, Naveen conducts his program in the hotel where Anand is also present, as usual, he gives a call to his brothers which Anand receives but Vijay keeps silent as his presence may harm them. Parallelly, Vijay makes Sony free, thereafter, a dead heat situation occurs, Parasuram kidnaps Anand & Naveen for the treasure. At last, Vijay plays a trick, protects his brothers, and eliminates Parasuram. The film ends with the reunion of the brothers.

Cast 

N. T. Rama Rao as Vijay
Murali Mohan as Anand
Nandamuri Balakrishna as Naveen
Latha as Sunitha/ Sony
Kanchana as Geetha
Jayamalini as Dancer
Prabhakar Reddy as Parasuram
Giri Babu as Shekar
A. V. M. Rajan as Venu Gopal Rao
Rajanala as Jailor
Raja Babu as Devadas
Raavi Kondala Rao as Manager Ramaiah
Thyagaraju as John
Bhimaraju as Montin
K. K. Sarma as Anand's friend
Chidatala Appa Rao
Chitti Babu
Pushpalata as Lakshmi
Anitha
Sujatha
Aparna
Vani

Soundtrack 
Music composed by Chakravarthy.

References

External links 

 

1970s masala films
1970s Telugu-language films
1975 films
Films directed by S. D. Lal
Films scored by K. Chakravarthy
Films set in hotels
Telugu remakes of Hindi films